Kolkata TV is a 24-hour Bengali news channel launched by SST Media in 2006. Ex ABP man Suman Chattopadhyay is responsible for its birth. Now it is owned by Kaustuv Ray, chairman of RP Group. The slogan used by the channel is Raatdin Saatdin (which means "Day-night 7-days").

The news channel is run by Calcutta-based RP Techvision (I) Pvt Ltd and known for its critical stance on Modi government, while being sympathetic towards TMC. It was taken over in 2009 without buying any shares by Kaustuv Ray, the current editor of Kolkata TV. He had been the subject of raids by the Enforcement Directorate in 2018 and was arrested by CBI for allegedly defrauding banks to the tune of Rs. 515 crores. He also received a notice from the ED in September 2021. After this the Ministry of Information and Broadcasting send a notice to the channel authorities, asking for a reply on why its license should not be cancelled. The letter, dated 27 September, cited the Ministry of Home Affairs’ denial of ‘security clearance’ to the channel as the ground for cancelling their license. Responding to the notice, Kaustuv Ray said the Central government was trying to silence the media critical of the prime minister. "This is a blatant way to gag the voice of free press. We will continue to raise our voice, we will protest against this fascist undemocratic regime of Mr Modi," said Ray. This move of the Union Government was criticised by leaders of AITC, Congress, CPI(M), Shiv Sena, Samajwadi Party and eminent persons of Bengal society. West Bengal Chief Minister Mamata Banerjee and Bhupesh Baghel, Chief minister of Chhattisgarh, also supported Kolkata TV over this issue. Special CBI Court directed ED Officers not to take any coercive action against Kaustuv Ray till hearing of the case and the Calcutta High Court put a stay order on the notice issued by Union Government.

See also
List of Bengali TV channels
List of Indian television stations

References

External links

24-hour television news channels in India
Television channels and stations established in 2006
Bengali-language television channels in India
Television stations in Kolkata
2006 establishments in West Bengal